North Brisbane could mean the following:
 The part of Brisbane that is north of the Brisbane River
 The Town of Brisbane, (pre 1925) to distinguish it from the separate Town of South Brisbane
 The Electoral district of North Brisbane, a district in the Legislative Assembly of Queensland from 1878 to 1888
 The Parish of North Brisbane, Queensland, a land administration unit covering the Brisbane CBD
 The Norths Devils, a rugby league team representing Brisbane's northern suburbs.